Humanists International (known as the International Humanist and Ethical Union, or IHEU, from 1952–2019) is an international non-governmental organisation championing secularism and human rights, motivated by secular humanist values. Founded in Amsterdam in 1952, it is an umbrella organisation made up of more than 160 secular humanist, atheist, rationalist, agnostic, skeptic, freethought and Ethical Culture organisations from over 80 countries.

Humanists International campaigns globally on human rights issues, with a specific emphasis on defending freedom of thought and expression and the rights of the non-religious, who are often a vulnerable minority in many parts of the world. The organisation is based in London but maintains a presence at the United Nations Human Rights Council in Geneva, the United Nations General Assembly in New York, and the Council of Europe in Strasbourg, among other international institutions. Its advocacy work focuses on shaping debates on issues associated with humanism, the rights of the non-religious, and promoting humanist attitudes to social issues.

Humanists International is particularly active in challenging blasphemy and apostasy laws around the world and at the UN. Its annual Freedom of Thought Report indexes the world's countries by treatment of the non-religious and their commitment to freedom of thought and expression. Working with its member organisations, it also helps to coordinate support for those fleeing danger from states which persecute the non-religious. It advocates a humanist approach to various social issues, contributing to bioethical debates and arguing in favour of sexual and reproductive health and rights, LGBT rights, children's rights and women's rights, and in opposition to slavery and caste discrimination.

Outside of its advocacy work, Humanists International functions as the democratic organ of the global humanist movement. It holds a general assembly each year and a World Humanist Congress usually every three years; its next World Congress will be held in Copenhagen, Denmark, in August 2023. Humanists International works to stimulate the growth of humanism and freethought and the spread of Enlightenment values around the world by supporting activists to form effective organisations in their home countries. In 2002, the Humanists International general assembly unanimously adopted the Amsterdam Declaration 2002, which presents as "the official defining statement of World Humanism". Its official symbol, the Happy Human, is shared with its member organisations worldwide.

Humanism as a life stance
In 2002, at the organisation's 50th anniversary World Humanist Congress, delegates unanimously passed a resolution known as the Amsterdam Declaration 2002, an update of the original Amsterdam Declaration (1952).

The Amsterdam Declaration defines Humanism as a "lifestance" that is "ethical", "rational", supportive of "democracy and human rights", insisting "that personal liberty must be combined with social responsibility"; it is "an alternative to dogmatic religion"; it values "artistic creativity and imagination" and is aimed at living lives of "fulfillment" through the powers of "free inquiry", "science" and "creative imagination".

In addition to the Amsterdam Declaration's "official statement of World Humanism", Humanists International provides a "Minimum Statement on Humanism":
Humanism is a democratic and ethical life stance, which affirms that human beings have the right and responsibility to give meaning and shape to their own lives. It stands for the building of a more humane society through an ethic based on human and other natural values in the spirit of reason and free inquiry through human capabilities. It is not theistic, and it does not accept supernatural views of reality.

Member Organisations of Humanists International are required according to its membership regulations to have objects that are "consistent" with this understanding of Humanism.

Other major resolutions 
At the World Humanist Congress in 2005, in France, the General Assembly adopted The Paris Declaration 2005, on state secularism, which states:There can be no freedom of conscience when religions rule societies. Secularism is the demand for equal rights for those who belong to any religion as well as for those who belong to none... For IHEU (International Humanist and Ethical Union) and its member organizations, the State must be secular, that is, neither religious not atheist. But demanding genuine democratic equality, recognized by the Law, between believers and humanists does not mean that the member associations of IHEU treat all philosophical points of view equally. We have no duty to respect irrationalism, however ancient its origins. True Humanism is the flourishing of freedom of conscience and the methods of free inquiry.In 2007, in an "unprecedented alliance" of the (then) International Humanist and Ethical Union, the European Humanist Federation and Catholics for Choice, launched the Brussels Declaration, a secular response to a proposed Berlin Declaration, under which the amended EU Constitution would have made references to "God" and the "Christian roots of Europe". It made specific reference to policy positions on equality and human rights for different minority groups, concluding: "The principles and values on which European civilisation is founded are once again under threat. We call upon the people of Europe and all who care for freedom, democracy and the rule of law to join us in promoting and protecting them."

At World Humanist Congress 2011, in Norway, the Humanists International General Assembly adopted The Oslo Declaration on Peace, which concludes: "We urge each of our member organizations and Humanists globally to work for a more peaceful culture in their own nations and urge all governments to prefer the peaceful settlement of conflicts over the alternative of violence and war."

At World Humanist Congress 2014, in the United Kingdom, the Humanists International General Assembly adopted The Oxford Declaration on Freedom of Thought and Expression, which asserts: "Freedom of thought implies the right to develop, hold, examine and manifest our beliefs without coercion, and to express opinions and a worldview whether religious or non-religious, without fear of coercion. It includes the right to change our views or to reject beliefs previously held, or previously ascribed. Pressure to conform to ideologies of the state or to doctrines of religion is a tyranny."

In 2017, Humanists International held a special conference on threats to humanism and liberal democracy from rising authoritarian populism and extremism as part of its general assembly in London. At the following general assembly in Auckland, New Zealand, in 2018, Humanists International members agreed The Auckland Declaration on the Politics of Division, which condemned a recent global resurgence of demagogy, "exemplified in a new generation of so-called “strong men” politicians, who purport to stand up for popular interests, but who are eager to diminish human rights and disregard minorities in order to gain and retain power for their own ends". The Declaration commits humanist organisations "to addressing the social causes of the politics of division: social inequality, a lack of respect for human rights, popular misconceptions about the nature of democracy" and affirms the "values of democracy, rule of law, equality, and human rights."

In 2019, Humanists International members unanimously passed the Reykjavik Declaration on the Climate Change Crisis, acknowledging the scientific consensus on anthropogenic climate change committing the international humanist movement to "foster a social and political commitment to urgent action and long-term policymaking to mitigate and prevent climate change."

Organisation

Founding in 1952 
Five Humanist organisations, the American Ethical Union, American Humanist Association, British Ethical Union (later the British Humanist Association and now Humanists UK), Vienna Ethical Society and the Dutch Humanist League hosted the founding congress of the International Humanist and Ethical Union in Amsterdam, 22–27 August 1952. On the last day of the congress five resolutions were passed, which included a statement of the fundamentals of "modern, ethical Humanism", a resolution which would come to be known as the Amsterdam Declaration (1952).

Current structure 

Humanists International is a democratic organisation, the Board of which is elected by representatives of the Member Organisations at annual General Assemblies. The President as of 2015 is Andrew Copson (who is also the Chief Executive of Humanists UK as of 2010). The IHEU headquarters is in London. It shared an office with Humanists UK for many years until 2019.

Representatives of Humanists International Member Organisations ratify new memberships annually during a General Assembly. Following the 2017 General Assembly, the IHEU listed its membership as 139 Member Organisations from 53 countries from a variety of non-religious traditions.

A staff of four is headed by the current Chief Executive, Gary McLelland, and Humanists International maintains delegations to the United Nations Human Rights Council in Geneva, the United Nations in New York, and the Council of Europe in Strasbourg.

Humanists International is an international NGO with Special Consultative Status with the United Nations, General Consultative Status at the Council of Europe, Observer Status with the African Commission on Human and Peoples’ Rights, and maintains operational relations with UNESCO.

Humanists International has a wing for people aged up to 35 called the Young Humanists International.

The organization's 2017 General Assembly passed a resolution "mandating the Board to oversee a transition to a revised identity for the organization". The rebrand to Humanists International, a new operating name for the IHEU, was completed in February 2019.

Board members 

Humanists International is governed by an international board of directors, whose body is elected by member organisations at annual general assemblies, including a directly elected president.

As of October 2020, the Board of Humanists International comprises:

 Andrew Copson (President) – Humanists UK
 Anne-France Ketelaer (Vice President) – deMens.nu, Flanders/Belgium
 Boris van der Ham (Treasurer) – Dutch Humanist Association
 Debbie Goddard – American Atheists
 Kristin Mile – Norwegian Humanist Association
 Leo Igwe – Humanist Association of Nigeria
 Roslyn Mould – Humanist Association of Ghana
 Uttam Niraula – Society for Humanism (SOCH) Nepal
 David Pineda – Humanistas Guatemala
 Anya Overmann – American Ethical Union (ex officio, President of Young Humanists International)

Strategy and activities 
The aim of Humanists International is to "build, support and represent the global humanist movement, defending human rights, particularly those of non-religious people, and promoting humanist values world-wide". As a campaigning NGO Humanists International aims "to influence international policy through representation and information, to build the humanist network, and let the world know about the worldview of Humanism."

The Freedom of Thought Report 

In 2012 Humanists International began publishing an annual report on "discrimination against humanists, atheists and the non-religious" called The Freedom of Thought Report.

The report centres around a "Country Index" with a textual entry for every sovereign state.

Each country is measured against a list of 64 boundary conditions, which are categorised into four thematic categories ("Constitution and government", "Education and children's rights", "Family, community, society, religious courts and tribunals", and "Freedom of expression, advocacy of humanist values") at five levels of overall "severity" ("Free and equal", "Mostly satisfactory", "Systemic discrimination", "Severe discrimination" and "Grave violations"). The 64 boundary conditions include for example: "'Apostasy' or conversion from a specific religion is outlawed and punishable by death", which is placed at the worst level of severity, and under the category "Freedom of expression", and: "There is state funding of at least some religious schools", which is a middle severity condition, under the category "Education and children's rights". The data from the report is freely available under a Creative Commons license.

Findings of the Freedom of Thought Report 
In 2017, the report found that 30 countries meet at least one boundary condition at the most severe level ("Grave violations"), and a further 55 countries met at least one boundary condition in the next most severe level ("Severe discrimination").

Responses to the Freedom of Thought Report 
The various annual editions of the Freedom of Thought Report have been reported in the media under headlines such as: "How the right to deny the existence of God is under threat globally" (The Independent, UK); "Most countries fail to respect rights of atheists – report" (Christian Today); and "Stephen Fry's mockery of religion could land him the death penalty in these countries" (The Washington Post). The report has received coverage in the national media of countries that are severely criticised, for example "Malaysia's free thought, religious expression under 'serious assault', study shows" (the Malay Mail).

Forewords and prefaces to the various annual editions of report have been written by then-United Nations Special Rapporteurs on Freedom of Religion or Belief, Heiner Bielefeldt, in 2012; two victims of "blasphemy" accusations, Kacem El Ghazzali and Alber Saber in 2013; human rights defenders Gulalai Ismail and Agnes Ojera in 2014; humanist activist and survivor of an anti-secularist machete attack in Bangladesh, Rafida Ahmed Bonya (2015); and United Nations Special Rapporteurs on Freedom of Religion or Belief, Ahmed Shaheed, in 2016. In 2015 and 2016 the annual edition of the Freedom of Thought Report was launched at the European Parliament in Brussels hosted by the European Parliamentary Intergroup on Freedom of Religion or Belief and Religious Tolerance chaired by Dennis de Jong MEP.

In his foreword to the first edition of the Freedom of Thought Report, Heiner Bielefeldt wrote:As a universal human right, freedom of religion or belief has a broad application. However, there seems to be little awareness that this right also provides a normative frame of reference for atheists, humanists and freethinkers and their convictions, practices and organizations. I am therefore delighted that for the first time the Humanist community has produced a global report on discrimination against atheists. I hope it will be given careful consideration by everyone concerned with freedom of religion or belief.At a panel event at the European Parliament for the launch of the 2015 edition, Bielefeldt said he "unambiguously welcomed" the report and reiterated with regard to "freedom of religion or belief" that it is "only a kind of short-hand", and "Formulations such as "religious freedom" obfuscate the scope of this human right which covers the identity-shaping, profound convictions and conviction-based practices of human beings broadly."

The report was the subject of a question in the UK Parliament in 2013, to which David Lidington MP responded for the government asserting, "Our freedom of religion or belief policy is consistent with the key message of the International Humanist and Ethical Union's (IHEU) report: that international human rights law exists to protect the rights of individuals to manifest their beliefs, not to protect the beliefs themselves. The report records a sharp increase in the number of prosecutions for alleged criticism of religion by atheists on social media. Protecting freedom of expression online is a priority for the British Government and we have consistently argued against attempts to create a new international standard in order to protect religions from criticism."

Focus of advocacy and campaigns 
Recurring themes of Humanists International's advocacy and campaigns work include LGBTI rights and women's rights, sexual and reproductive health and rights, laws against blasphemy and apostasy, caste-based discrimination, slavery, and advocacy of secularism.

Persecuted non-religious individuals 

Individuals persecuted for expressing their non-religious views (actual or perceived) have frequently been the subject of IHEU campaigns. Some prominent cases include:
 In the 1990s IHEU was instrumental in highlighting the threats against Taslima Nasrin who lives in exile from Bangladesh, and who also acted as a representative of the IHEU at UNESCO.
 The IHEU and Amnesty International led the campaign in 2004 to try to obtain the release of Younus Shaikh who was accused of "blasphemy" in Pakistan.
 In 2013 the IHEU urged the authorities in Egypt to ensure the safety of Alber Saber after he was accused of "offending religion" for allegedly linking to the YouTube video "Innocence of Muslims".
 In 2014 the IHEU blew the whistle on the case of Mubarak Bala from Nigeria, who was detained in a psychiatric hospital after he talked openly about being an atheist. He was freed following international media coverage.
 In 2017, after a government minister in Malaysia said members of an atheist meetup group would be "hunted down", the IHEU called for respect of the atheists' human rights, and the organization's condemnation of the minister's remarks was reported in Malaysian media.
The IHEU delegation at the United Nations Human Rights Council has repeatedly raised the imprisonment and corporal punishment of Raif Badawi for "insulting religion", and Waleed Abulkhair for "disrespecting the authorities", both in Saudi Arabia.

Humanists International similarly highlights cases where individuals are accused of "apostasy", such as the blogger Mohamed Cheikh Ould Mkhaitir currently on death row in Mauritania, and the poet Ashraf Fayadh currently imprisoned in Saudi Arabia. In June 2016 at the 32nd session of the Human Rights Council the IHEU's delegate took the unusual step of reading one of Ashraf Fayadh's poems during General Debate.

Bangladesh machete murders 

Humanists International complained that fundamentalists linked to the government were "terrorising" secular activists, including individuals in connection with its Member Organisations, as far back as 2006. However, a series of machete attacks primarily targeting secular and atheist bloggers and freethinkers in Bangladesh has been especially severe since 2013, and the IHEU has campaigned persistently in response and highlighted the murders at the UN Human Rights Council.

Humanists International responded in 2013 to the murder of blogger and activist Ahmed Rajib Haider and the machete attack on his friend Asif Mohiuddin, and highlighted the subsequent arrest and imprisonment of Mohiuddin and others for "hurting religious sentiments".

When author and prominent leader of the Bengali freethought movement Avijit Roy was murdered, 26 February 2015, Humanists International revealed that he had been advising them on the situation in Bangladesh; Humanists International Director of Communications commented, "This loss is keenly felt by freethinkers and humanists in South Asia and around the world. He was a colleague in humanism and a friend to all who respect human rights, freedom, and the light of reason."

Following the murder of Washiqur Rahman Babu (or Oyasiqur Rhaman), 30 March 2015, Humanists International republished some of his final writings.

Following the murder of Ananta Bijoy Das, 12 May 2016, Humanists International leaked parts of the letter Bijoy Das had recently received from Sweden rejecting his visa application, despite his having been invited to the country by Swedish PEN. The organisation highlighted "the failures of the Bangladeshi authorities to bring to justice the individuals and to break the networks behind this string of targeted killings", and also criticised Sweden's rejection of his visa application, commenting, "We call on all countries to recognise the legitimacy and sometimes the urgency and moral necessity of asylum claims made by humanists, atheists and secularists who are being persecuted for daring to express those views."

Following the murder of Niladri Chattopadhyay Niloy (or Niloy Chatterjee, also known by his pen name Niloy Neel), 7 August 2015, Humanists International again attacked the government and authorities, saying, "Apparent failure to pursue the most obvious lines of inquiry even when initial arrests are made, and media manipulation resulting in conflicting stories, further makes reportage difficult and police operations opaque."

A coordinated attack against two separate publishing houses in Dhaka, 31 October 2016, killed the publisher Faisal Arefin Dipon and seriously injured the publisher Ahmedur Rashid Chowdhury. The IHEU later published an interview with Chowdhury about the attack and his escape to Norway.

In August 2015 Humanists International coordinated a joint open letter in English and Bangla by a coalition of "Bloggers, free speech campaigners, humanist associations, religious and ex-Muslim groups" calling on the president and prime minister of Bangladesh to "ensure the safety and security of those individuals whose lives are threatened by Islamist extremists... instruct the police to find the killers, not to harass or blame the victims... disassociate yourself publicly from those who call for death penalties against non-religious Bangladeshis..." and repeal the laws under which secular bloggers faced arrest and imprisonment.

Following the murder of a student and secular activist Nazimuddin Samad, 6 April 2016, and then the murder of university lecturer Professor Rezaul Karim Siddique, 23 April 2016, Humanists International president Andrew Copson said "Unless the government [of Bangladesh] immediately begins to defend the right to speak and write freely, without adding the unprincipled and anti-secular qualifications that it keeps applying to freedom of expression, then very soon the only voices that will be heard will be those of murderous extremists."

Humanists International, along with its Member Organisation the Dutch Humanist Association, and Hague Peace Projects, organised a "solidarity book fair" in The Hague, 26 February 2016, to coincide with the annual Ekushey Book Fair in Dhaka.

The range of targets for these attacks began to broaden in the later part of 2015 and throughout 2016 to more often include minority religious individuals and foreigners, culminating in the July 2016 Dhaka attack in Gulshan Thana.

End Blasphemy Laws campaign  
In January 2015, in part as a response to the Charlie Hebdo shooting, Humanists International alongside other transnational secular groups the European Humanist Federation and Atheist Alliance International and a two-hundred strong organisational coalition, founded the End Blasphemy Laws Campaign. End Blasphemy Laws is "campaigning to repeal "blasphemy" and related laws worldwide."

Other campaigns 
The "First World Conference on Untouchability" was organised by Humanists International in London, June 2009. Anticipating the event, the BBC News quoted then-Executive Director Babu Gogineni as saying that legal reforms alone would not end caste discrimination: "There are Dalit politicians in India, but nothing has changed. The answer is to educate Dalits and empower them." The event was preceded by questions in the UK Parliament and guests included Lord Desai and Lord Avebury from the UK House of Lords; Binod Pahadi, Member of the Constituent Assembly, Nepal; and Tina Ramirez, US Congressional Fellow on International Religious Freedom. The Second World Conference on Untouchability was held in Kathmandu, in April 2014.

In 2013 Humanists International criticised the US-based Appeal of Conscience Foundation for awarding their "World Statesman Award" to then-president of Indonesia Susilo Bambang Yudhoyono; it argued that the award "is a slap in the face to prisoners of conscience across the world. While Alexander Aan suffers in an Indonesian jail for posting his beliefs to Facebook, his jailer will be honored in New York as a champion of freedom of belief."

In 2014 Humanists International as part of a "coalition of secular groups" led a campaign around the hashtag "#TwitterTheocracy" to protest the social media website Twitter's implementation of tools blocking "blasphemous" tweets in Pakistan.

Historical dates and figures

Chairs and presidents

Awards
The IHEU makes a number of regular and occasional special awards.

International Humanist Award
The International Humanist Award recognises outstanding achievements and contributions to the progress and defence of Humanism.

1970: Barry Commoner (United States of America), environmentalist professor
1974: Harold John Blackham (UK), founding member IHEU, IHEU secretary (1952–1966)
1978: Vithal Mahadeo Tarkunde (India), former judge of the Bombay High Court
1982: Kurt Partzsch (Germany), former Minister for Social Affairs in Lower Saxony (Germany) 
1986: Arnold Clausse (Belgium), professor emeritus of education
1986: The Atheist Centre (India), for pioneering social reform activities
1988: Andrei Sakharov (USSR), nuclear physicist, developer of the hydrogen bomb for the Soviet military, and winner of the Nobel Prize for Peace
1990: Alexander Dubček (Czechoslovakia), leader of Czechoslovakia during the "Prague Spring" of 1968
1992: Pieter Admiraal (Netherlands), a Dutch anaesthetist, and euthanasia advocate
1999: Professor Paul Kurtz (USA), writer and founder of the Committee for Skeptical Inquiry
2002: Amartya Sen (India), economist, social theorist, Master of Trinity College (Cambridge), and winner of the 1998 The Bank of Sweden Prize in Economic Sciences in Memory of Alfred Nobel
2005: Jean-Claude Pecker (France), astronomer
2008: Philip Pullman (UK), best-selling author of children's literature, including His Dark Materials trilogy
2011: Sophie in 't Veld, (Netherlands) MEP and vice-chair of the European Parliament Committee on Civil Liberties, and PZ Myers (USA), biology professor at University of Minnesota Morris, and author of the Pharyngula blog
2014: Gulalai Ismail (Pakistan), the founder and chair of Aware Girls, a charity which promotes the developmental and human rights of young women in Pakistan and Wole Soyinka (Nigeria), Nobel Prize-winning author

Distinguished Service to Humanism Award
The Distinguished Service to Humanism Award recognises the contributions of Humanist activists to International Humanism and to organised Humanism.

1988: Corliss Lamont (United States of America); Indumati Parikh (India); Mathilde Krim (United States)
1990: Jean Jacques Amy (Belgium)
1992: Indumati Parikh (India); Vern Bullough (USA); Nettie Klein, also volunteer IHEU secretary general (1982–1996)
1996: Jim Herrick (UK); James Dilloway
1999: Abe Solomon; Paul Postma
2002: Phil Ward
2005: Barbara Smoker (UK); Marius Dées de Stério
2007: Keith Porteous Wood (UK)
2008: Roy W Brown (UK)
2011: V B Rawat (India); Narendra Nayak (India); David Pollock (UK)
2012: Margaretha Jones (United States of America)
2013: Josh Kutchinsky (UK)
2014: Robbi Robson (UK)
2015: Hope Knutsson (Iceland)
2016: Sonja Eggerickx (Belgium)
2017: Leo Igwe (Nigeria)
2020: Becky Hale (USA); Bert Gasenbeek (Netherlands); Dr. Sudesh Ghoderao (India)

Other Awards
1978: Special Award for Service to World Humanism: Harold John Blackham; Jaap van Praag; Sidney Scheuer (also IHEU treasurer, 1952–1987)
1988: Humanist Laureate Award: Betty Friedan; Herbert Hauptman; Steve Allen
1988: Humanist of the Year Award: Henry Morgentaler
1992: Distinguished Human Rights Award: Elena Bonner
1996: Humanist Awards: Shulamit Aloni; Taslima Nasrin; Xiao Xuehui
2008: Lifetime Achievement Award: Levi Fragell (Norway)
2017: Distinguished Services to Anti-Superstition Award: Narendra Dhabolkar (India)

See also
 World Humanist Congress
 World Humanist Day

References

External links

Freedom of Thought Report website
End Blasphemy Laws campaign website

Antireligion
Atheist organizations
Ethical movement
Ethics organizations
Freethought organizations
Humanist associations
International organisations based in London
Organisations based in the London Borough of Lambeth
Organizations established in 1952
Secular humanism
Secularist organizations
Skeptic organisations in the United Kingdom
1952 establishments in the Netherlands